Al-Mekrab  is a  rural sub-district's village in Adh Dhlia'ah District, Hadhramaut Governorate, Yemen.

According to the 2004 Yemeni Census, the population of the sub-district was 118 residents.

As of 2014, the population of Al-Mekrab reached 158.

References 

 National Information Center, Yemen.
 Comprehensive guide to all regions in Yemen - دليلك الشامل إلي اليمن، كل مناطقها.

Villages in Yemen